Kuhgir may refer to:

Kuhgir-e Olya
Kuhgir-e Sofla
Kuhgir Rural District, in Qazvin Province